Pashur or Pashhur (Hebrew: פשחור pash-hur) was the name of at least two priests contemporary with the prophet Jeremiah and who are mentioned in the Book of Jeremiah. The name is of Egyptian origin, Pš-Ḥr.

Pashur ben Immer
Pashur the son of Immer (possibly the same as Amariah, Nehemiah), was deputy chief priest of the temple (Jeremiah 20:1, 2). (At this time, the nagid, or "governor", of the temple would have been Seraiah - 1 Chronicles ). Apparently enraged at the plainness with which Jeremiah uttered his solemn warnings of coming judgements because of the abounding iniquity of the times, Pashur "smote Jeremiah the prophet" (this could mean that he ordered the temple police to seize him and inflict the corporal punishment of up to forty stripes found in Deuteronomy ); then he placed him in the stocks in the high gate of Benjamin, where he remained all night.

Pashur ben Malchiah 
Pashur, the son of Malchiah, was another priest, who was sent by king Zedekiah to Jeremiah to inquire of the Lord regarding the impending attack of King Nebuchadnezzar II of Babylon (Jeremiah 21:1). In Jeremiah 38:1-6, this Pashur was also one of four men who advised Zedekiah to put Jeremiah to death for his prophecies of doom but who ended up throwing him into a cistern.

Gedaliah ben Pashur 
Pashur the father of Gedaliah (Jeremiah 38:1), possibly the same Pashur as (1) above. Gedaliah was another of the four men who threw Jeremiah into the cistern.

Historicity 
The pottery shards of the Tel Arad ostraca unearthed in the 1970s written in Paleo-Hebrew mention Pashur (Jeremiah 20:1),

References

6th-century BCE Jews